Tamaryn  Schultz (born 23 April 1985) is a South African gymnast.

Childhood
She was born on 23 April 1985 and grew up in Durbanville, Western Cape, South Africa. She matriculated at Fairmont High School, Durbanville.

Gymnastic performance

She performed in various competitions all over the world.

 25 June 2000, she won the South African National Championship (held in Centurion, South Africa) with a score of 35, winning three of the four gymnastics disciplines (vault, bars, beam and floor) in the junior category.
 14 September 2001, in her first year as a senior she placed second to the 2000 champion Joyce, in the South African National Championship (held in Pretoria, South Africa).
 5 November 2001, she placed second in the "Internationaler Leverkusen Cup" (held in Leverkusen, Germany) with a score of 32.775, just beaten by Nijssen of The Netherlands.
 In the 6th African Gymnastics Championships in 2002, held in Algeria, she placed first overall with 33.112 points.
 20 November 2002, she represented South Africa in The World Artistic Championship in  Debrecen, Hungary, and obtained the following places: Floor - 36th, Bars - 40th, Beams - 41st.

References 

1985 births
Living people
South African gymnasts
Sportspeople from the Western Cape